Sanarik is a 2014 horror Indian Meitei language film directed by L. Rajesh and produced by Khelen Mangang, under the banner of Mosbran Films. The film features baby Rekha Heigrujam in the titular role with Lairenjam Olen, Nirmala, Idhou, Mangoljao, Merina, Thoibi and Sagolsem Dhanamanjuri in the lead roles. It is a feature film about an abnormal girl who is being harassed because of her looks and colour. The film was released at Manipur Film Development Corporation (MFDC), Palace Compound on 28 January 2014.

Cast
 Baby Rekha Heigrujam as Sanarik
 Lairenjam Olen as Doren, School Principal
 Idhou as Tharosangbi's husband
 Sagolsem Dhanamanjuri as Tharosangbi
 Samjetsabam Mangoljao
 Khun Surchandra
 Merina
 Nirmala

Awards
Baby Rekha Heigrujam got the Best Child Artist Award in 4th SSS MANIFA 2015.

Soundtrack
H. Khelen (Pee) composed the soundtrack for the film and Huidrom Noren wrote the lyrics. The song is titled Nongdam Thina Poklaklabi Eini.

References

2010s Meitei-language films
2014 films